The women's 1500 metres at the 2002 European Athletics Championships were held at the Olympic Stadium on August 9–11.

Medalists

Results

Heats
Qualification: First 3 of each heat (Q) and the next 3 fastest (q) qualified for the final.

Final

External links

1500
1500 metres at the European Athletics Championships
2002 in women's athletics